The European Centre for Disease Prevention and Control (ECDC) is an agency of the European Union (EU) whose mission is to strengthen Europe's defences against infectious diseases. It covers a wide spectrum of activities, such as: surveillance, epidemic intelligence, response, scientific advice, microbiology, preparedness, public health training, international relations, health communication, and the scientific journal Eurosurveillance. The centre was established in 2004 and is headquartered in Solna, Sweden.

History and operations

As EU economic integration and open frontiers increased, cooperation on public health issues became more important. While the idea of creating a European centre for disease control had been discussed previously by public health experts, the 2003 SARS outbreak and the rapid spread of SARS across country borders confirmed the urgency of the creation of an EU-wide institution for public health. ECDC was set up in record time for an EU agency: the European Commission presented draft legislation in July 2003; by the spring of 2004, Regulation (EC) 851/2004 had been passed, and in May 2005 the Centre became operational. The relevance of the centre's mission was confirmed shortly after it began operating, when the arrival of H5N1 avian influenza in the EU's neighbourhood led to fears that the disease could adapt or mutate into a pandemic strain of human influenza. The Centre moved to its current location at Gustav III:s Boulevard 40, 16973 Solna, Sweden, on 3 March 2018.

The ECDC is manages key initiatives that focus on surveillance and response support, and public health capacity and communication, while the office of the Chief Scientist oversees the Microbiology Coordination Section and the Scientific Advice Coordination Section, along with seven Disease Programmes.

The Disease Programmes focus on specific disease groups:
 Antimicrobial resistance and Healthcare-associated infections
 Emerging and Vector-borne Diseases
 Food- and Waterborne Diseases and Zoonoses
 Sexually Transmitted Infections, including HIV and Blood-borne Viruses
 Influenza
 Tuberculosis
 Vaccine-preventable diseases

Publications
ECDC publishes numerous scientific and technical reports covering various issues related to the prevention and control of  communicable diseases. Comprehensive reports from key technical and scientific meetings are also produced by the organization.

Towards the end of every calendar year, ECDC publishes its Annual Epidemiological Report, which analyses surveillance data and infectious disease threats. As well as offering an overview of the public health situation in the European Union, the report offers an indication of where further public health action may be required in order to reduce the burden caused by communicable diseases.

European Centre for Disease Prevention and Control is monitoring the Middle East respiratory syndrome coronavirus.

Other ECDC publications include disease-specific surveillance reports and threat reports, as well as analyses of trends in European public health.

Eurosurveillance
Eurosurveillance, a European peer-reviewed journal devoted to the epidemiology, surveillance, prevention and control of infectious diseases, has been published by ECDC since March 2007. The journal was founded in 1995 and, before its move to ECDC, was a collaborative project between the European Commission, the Institut de Veille Sanitaire (France) and the Health Protection Agency (United Kingdom). Eurosurveillance is an open-access (i.e. free) web-based journal that reports infectious disease issues from a European perspective. It publishes results from ECDC and the EU-funded surveillance networks, thereby providing the scientific community with timely access to new information. The journal is published every Thursday.

Member states
In addition to the member states of the union, three members of the European Economic Area also participate in the ECDC network: Iceland, Liechtenstein, Norway.

The United Kingdom benefited from the ECDC during the Brexit transition period from February 1 to December 31, 2020.

COVID-19
During the COVID-19 pandemic, involved in the European Union response to the COVID-19 pandemic the ECDC published data related to COVID-19 such as number of people affected in the European Union.

See also
 European Medicines Agency
 European Programme for Intervention Epidemiology Training

For similar agencies, please see the List of national public health agencies
 World Health Organization (WHO)
 Communicable diseases
 Pandemic
 Public health
 Health Threat Unit
 List of national public health agencies

References

Citations

Sources 

 ecdc.europa.eu
 ecdc.europa.eu

External links
 
 Eurosurveillance
 

Agencies of the European Union
Public health organizations
European medical and health organizations
2004 establishments in Sweden
2004 in the European Union
Government agencies established in 2004
Stockholm County
Scientific organizations based in Sweden
National public health agencies
Health and the European Union